The 1989 Army Cadets football team was an American football team that represented the United States Military Academy in the 1989 NCAA Division I-A football season. In their seventh season under head coach Jim Young, the Cadets compiled a 6–5 record and outscored their opponents by a combined total of 316 to 212.  In the annual Army–Navy Game, the Cadets lost to Navy, 19–17.

Schedule

Personnel

Season summary

at Syracuse

Wake Forest

Harvard

at Duke

Holy Cross

Lafayette

Rutgers

at Air Force

Boston College

Colgate

vs Navy

References

Army
Army Black Knights football seasons
Army Cadets football